Mordechai Limon (January 3, 1924 – May 15, 2009) was the fourth commander of the Israeli navy, serving from December 14, 1950, until July 1, 1954.

Limon was born in Baranovichi and made aliyah to Mandatory Palestine in 1932. He grew up in Tel Aviv and joined Hashomer Hatzair youth movement.

During World War II, Limon joined the Palmach, and served in Palyam.

Limon oversaw the Cherbourg Project that involved smuggling five missile boats that had originally been purchased by Israel and embargoed by France. He would be subsequently expelled from France. His daughter, Nili Limon (born 1951), is married to Nathaniel Robert de Rothschild, son of Élie de Rothschild.

References

External links
Official Website of the Palyam

1924 births
2009 deaths
People from Baranavichy
People from Nowogródek Voivodeship (1919–1939)
Belarusian Jews
Polish emigrants to Mandatory Palestine
Jews in Mandatory Palestine
Israeli people of Belarusian-Jewish descent
Israeli Navy generals
Aliyah Bet activists
Israeli people of the 1948 Arab–Israeli War